Hahnia is a genus of dwarf sheet spiders that was first described by C. L. Koch in 1841.

Species
 it contains 102 species:

H. abrahami (Hewitt, 1915) – South Africa
H. alini Tikader, 1964 – Nepal
H. arizonica Chamberlin & Ivie, 1942 – USA
H. banksi Fage, 1938 – Costa Rica, Panama
H. barbara Denis, 1937 – Algeria
H. barbata Bosmans, 1992 – Indonesia (Sulawesi)
H. benoiti Bosmans & Thijs, 1980 – Kenya
H. biapophysis Huang & Zhang, 2017 – China
H. breviducta Bosmans & Thijs, 1980 – Kenya
H. caeca (Georgescu & Sarbu, 1992) – Romania
H. caelebs Brignoli, 1978 – Bhutan
H. cameroonensis Bosmans, 1987 – Cameroon
H. cervicornata Wang & Zhang, 1986 – China
H. chaoyangensis Zhu & Zhu, 1983 – China
H. cinerea Emerton, 1890 – North America
H. clathrata Simon, 1898 – South Africa
H. corticicola Bösenberg & Strand, 1906 – Russia (East Siberia, Far East), China, Korea, Taiwan, Japan
H. crozetensis Hickman, 1939 – Crozet Is.
H. dewittei Bosmans, 1986 – Congo
H. dongi Huang & Zhang, 2017 – China
H. eburneensis Jocqué & Bosmans, 1982 – Ivory Coast
H. eidmanni (Roewer, 1942) – Equatorial Guinea (Bioko)
H. falcata Wang, 1989 – China
H. flaviceps Emerton, 1913 – USA
H. gigantea Bosmans, 1986 – Central Africa
H. glacialis Sørensen, 1898 – Russia (East Siberia, Far East), North America
H. harmae Brignoli, 1977 – Tunisia
H. hauseri Brignoli, 1978 – Spain (Balearic Is.)
H. helveola Simon, 1875 – Europe, Turkey
H. heterophthalma Simon, 1905 – Argentina
H. himalayaensis Hu & Zhang, 1990 – China, Vietnam
H. implexa Seo, 2017 – Korea
H. inflata Benoit, 1978 – Kenya
H. innupta Brignoli, 1978 – Bhutan
H. insulana Schenkel, 1938 – Madeira
H. jocquei Bosmans, 1982 – Malawi
H. laodiana Song, 1990 – China
H. larseni Marusik, 2017 – South Africa
H. laticeps Simon, 1898 – South Africa
H. lehtineni Brignoli, 1978 – Bhutan
H. leopoldi Bosmans, 1982 – Cameroon
H. linderi Wunderlich, 1992 – Canary Is.
H. lobata Bosmans, 1981 – South Africa
H. maginii Brignoli, 1977 – Italy
H. major Benoit, 1978 – Kenya
H. manengoubensis Bosmans, 1987 – Cameroon
H. martialis Bösenberg & Strand, 1906 – Japan
H. mauensis Bosmans, 1986 – Kenya
H. michaelseni Simon, 1902 – Chile, Argentina, Falkland Is.
H. molossidis Brignoli, 1979 – Greece
H. montana Seo, 2017 – Korea
H. mridulae Tikader, 1970 – India
H. musica Brignoli, 1978 – Bhutan, China
H. naguaboi (Lehtinen, 1967) – Puerto Rico
H. nava (Blackwall, 1841) – Europe, Russia (Europe to Far East), Turkey, Israel, Caucasus, Iran, Korea, Japan
H. nigricans Benoit, 1978 – Kenya
H. nobilis Opell & Beatty, 1976 – Mexico
H. obliquitibialis Bosmans, 1982 – Malawi
H. okefinokensis Chamberlin & Ivie, 1934 – USA
H. ononidum Simon, 1875 – USA, Canada, Europe, Turkey, Russia (Europe to Far East), Kazakhstan
H. oreophila Simon, 1898 – Sri Lanka
H. ovata Song & Zheng, 1982 – China
H. petrobia Simon, 1875 – Spain, France, Italy, Germany
H. pinicola Arita, 1978 – Japan
H. pusilla C. L. Koch, 1841 (type) – Europe, Russia (Europe to South Siberia)
H. pusio Simon, 1898 – Sri Lanka
H. pyriformis Yin & Wang, 1984 – China
H. quadriseta Galán-Sánchez & Álvarez-Padilla, 2017 – Mexico
H. rimaformis Zhang, Li & Pham, 2013 – Vietnam
H. rossii Brignoli, 1977 – Italy
H. saccata Zhang, Li & Zheng, 2011 – China
H. sanjuanensis Exline, 1938 – USA, Mexico
H. schubotzi Strand, 1913 – Central, East Africa
H. senaria Zhang, Li & Zheng, 2011 – China
H. sexoculata Ponomarev, 2009 – Russia (Caucasus)
H. sibirica Marusik, Hippa & Koponen, 1996 – Russia (Europe to Far East), China
H. simoni Mello-Leitão, 1919 – Brazil
H. sirimoni Benoit, 1978 – Kenya
H. spasskyi Denis, 1958 – Afghanistan
H. spinata Benoit, 1978 – Kenya
H. subcorticicola Liu, Huang & Zhang, 2015 – China
H. submaginii Zhang, Li & Zheng, 2011 – China
H. subsaccata Huang & Zhang, 2017 – China
H. tabulicola Simon, 1898 – Africa
H. tanikawai Suguro, 2015 – Japan
H. tatei (Gertsch, 1934) – Venezuela
H. thorntoni Brignoli, 1982 – China, Hong Kong, Laos, Japan
H. thymorum Emerit & Ledoux, 2014 – France
H. tikaderi Brignoli, 1978 – Bhutan
H. tortuosa Song & Kim, 1991 – China
H. tuybaana Barrion & Litsinger, 1995 – Philippines
H. ulyxis Brignoli, 1974 – Greece
H. upembaensis Bosmans, 1986 – Congo
H. vangoethemi Benoit, 1978 – Kenya
H. vanwaerebeki Bosmans, 1987 – Cameroon
H. veracruzana Gertsch & Davis, 1940 – Mexico
H. wangi Huang & Zhang, 2017 – China
H. weiningensis Huang, Chen & Zhang, 2018 – China
H. yakouensis Chen, Yan & Yin, 2009 – China
H. zhejiangensis Song & Zheng, 1982 – China, Taiwan, Vietnam
H. zhui Zhang & Chen, 2015 – China
H. zodarioides (Simon, 1898) – South Africa

References

Araneomorphae genera
Cosmopolitan spiders
Hahniidae